Euphorbia piscatoria, the fish-stunning spurge, is a species of flowering plant in the spurge family Euphorbiaceae. It is endemic to the Madeira archipelago ]. This species is a shrubby succulent. As most other succulent members of the genus Euphorbia, its trade is regulated under Appendix II of CITES.

References

External links

piscatoria
Plants described in 1789
Flora of Madeira
piscatoria